Ferdy Sambo (born 9 February 1973) is a former high-ranking Indonesian National Police officer who last served as the Head of the Profession and Security Division of the Indonesian National Police with the rank of Inspector General of Police. He is known for his involvement in the murder of his aide-de-camp, Brigadier Nofriansyah Yosua Hutabarat. He was described as the "mastermind" of the killing, in which Hutabarat was shot 12 times with a Glock 17. Following a three month trial at the South Jakarta District Court, on 13 February 2023, Sambo was found guilty and sentenced to death. He has appealed against his sentence.

Early life 
Ferdy Sambo was born on 9 February 1973, in Barru, South Sulawesi to William Sambo. His brother is Leonardo Sambo (born 2 June 1971). He went to SMPN 6 Makassar, where he met his future wife, Putri Candrawati. After completing high school, Sambo attended the police academy where he graduated in 1994.

Personal life 
Sambo married Putri Candrawati (born 1973) on 7 July 2000, who previously had a career as a dentist. The couple had four children named Trisha Eungelica Ardyadana (born 2001), Yakobus Jacki Uly (born 2005), Adrianus Sooai (born 2007), and Arka. During his trial, it was revealed that his youngest child was adopted.

There has been controversy surrounding his wealth, with the public wondering how he owns various luxury cars and owns several properties across the country despite the salary for police generals in Indonesia.

Career 

His career in the police was fairly successful, especially in the field of detectives, after he was promoted from Head of Criminal Investigation Unit of West Jakarta Police to Chief of Police of Purbalingga in Central Java in 2012. Before serving as the Head of the Propam Police Division, Sambo was the Dirtipidum of the Criminal Investigation Unit of the police.

Murder of Brigadier Yosua 

Brigadier Nofriansyah Yosua Hutabarat was shot at the Jakarta home of Ferdy Sambo on 8 July 2022 at approximately 17:00 Western Indonesian Time. Hutabarat, a bodyguard and driver for Sambo, was said to have died after a shootout with another member of the protection team, Second Patrolman Richard Eliezer Pudihang Lumiu, allegedly after Hutabarat sexually harassed Sambo's wife, Putri Candrawati. After the shooting, Hutabarat was transported by ambulance to a hospital where he was pronounced dead, though news of the shooting was delayed until 11 July 2022.

On 9 August 2022, Sambo was taken into custody and charged with premeditated murder, which carries the death penalty or life imprisonment. It was later alleged that patrolman Lumiu had been promised immunity from prosecution by Sambo if he followed through with Sambo's version of the shooting. Despite the assurance of Sambo, Lumiu continued to be the sole suspect for the murder, prompting Lumiu to provide the police with a more accurate and open testimony that contradicted Sambo's version of the event.

Head of Indonesian police, General Listyo Sigit Prabowo told a press conference that Sambo had fired multiple pistol shots into a wall in an attempt to show a gunfight had led to Hutabarat's death; there had been no shoot-out and that Sambo had orchestrated Hutabarat's murder. He was described as the "mastermind" of the killing, in which Hutabarat was shot 12 times with a Glock 17.

Trial
The murder trial of Ferdy Sambo, his wife, two police officers and a driver – all facing charges of premeditated murder – started in South Jakarta District Court on 17 October 2022. Sambo was accused of ordering a subordinate to shoot Hutabarat, then shooting the wounded victim again himself to kill him. In parallel with the murder trial, seven former officers including Sambo were tried on charges of obstruction of justice related to alleged cover-ups and destruction of evidence.

In January 2023, the court rejected allegations that Hutabarat had raped, sexually assaulted or had an adulterous affair with Sambo's wife, Putri Candrawathi. Prosecutors said Candrawathi had invented a story that she had been raped by Hutabarat, and had repeatedly changed her version of events leading up to the shooting.

On 13 February 2023, Ferdy Sambo was found "legally and convincingly guilty" of the premeditated murder of Hutabarat and sentenced to death – a penalty usually carried out in Indonesia by firing squad. Verdicts and sentences regarding Candrawathi and the three other accused followed later in the week. Sambo has a week to appeal the verdict; his role as a law enforcer was seen by observers as a factor in the court imposing the maximum sentence – Ardi Manto Saputra, deputy director of human rights group Imparsial said Sambo had "tainted the reputation of law enforcement and the government's dignity".

Candrawathi received a 20-years prison sentence for her role in the murder; her personal assistant Kuat Ma'ruf was given 15 years, and Ricky Rizal Wibowo was given a 13-year sentence (in all three cases, the prosecution had requested eight-year terms). On 15 February 2023, Richard Eliezer Pudihang Lumiu was sentenced to 18 months in prison for his role in the murder; the prosecution had requested a twelve-year term but he was given a lighter sentence for his efforts as a justice collaborator.

On 15 and 16 February 2023, lawyers for four defendants (Ma'ruf, Sambo, Candrawathi and Rizal) submitted appeals against their sentences; prosecutors lodged counter-appeals.

References

1973 births
Living people
People from South Sulawesi
People convicted of murder
Indonesian police officers
Indonesian generals
20th-century Indonesian people
21st-century Indonesian people
Controversies in Indonesia